Hans Schmidt may refer to:

Military 
 Hans Schmidt (general) (1895–1971), German general in World War II, involved in Battle of the Hurtgen Forest
 Hans Schmidt (general of the Infantry) (1877–1948), German general in World War II
 Hans Schmidt (Waffen-SS) (1927–2010), former Waffen-SS man, chairman of the German American National Political Action Committee, self-published author
 Hans-Thilo Schmidt (1888–1943), spy, sold secrets about the Germany's Enigma machine to the French

Sports 
 Hans Schmidt (wrestler) (1925–2012), stage name of Guy Larose, Canadian wrestler
 Hans Schmidt (bobsleigh), German bobsledder
 Hans Schmidt (footballer, born 1887) (1887–1916), German international footballer
 Hans Schmidt (footballer, born 1893) (1893–1971), German international footballer and manager

Other 
 Hans Schmidt (priest) (1881–1916), American Roman Catholic priest executed for committing murder
 Hans Christian Schmidt (born 1953), teacher and Danish Minister of Food
 Hans Schmidt-Isserstedt (1900–1973), German conductor and composer
 Hans Werner Schmidt (1859–1950), German painter, illustrator and etcher
 Hans Schmidt (architect) (1893–1972), Swiss architect, befriended with Mart Stam
 Hans Schmidt (musician) (1854–1923), German composer, pianist and poet, close friend of Raimund von zur-Mühlen
 Hans Schmidt-Horix (1909–1970), German diplomat, former ambassador to Afghanistan, Iraq and Portugal

See also 
 SS Hans Schmidt, German cargo on the list of shipwrecks in January 1943
 Hans Schmitt (1835–1907), pianist and professor at the Vienna Conservatory of the Gesellschaft der Musikfreunde, see List of music students by teacher: R to S